The 1977–78 NHL season was the 61st season of the National Hockey League. The Montreal Canadiens won their third Stanley Cup in a row, defeating the Boston Bruins four games to two in the Stanley Cup Finals.

League business
Prior to the start of the season, Clarence Campbell retired as NHL President. John Ziegler succeeded him in that capacity.

A trophy for the top defensive forward, the Frank J. Selke Trophy, made its debut this season and went to Bob Gainey, who played left wing for Montreal.

On June 14, 1978, the league approved the merger of the financially struggling Cleveland Barons and Minnesota North Stars franchises, reducing the number of teams to 17, with the North Stars (now the Dallas Stars) assuming the Barons' place in the Adams Division.  It was the first instance of a franchise dissolving since the Brooklyn Americans ceased operations in 1942. The next time the NHL had a team in Ohio would be the expansion Columbus Blue Jackets in the 2000–01 season.

The league changed the playoff qualification format for this season. Whereas before the top three teams in every division qualified, the format was changed to guarantee the top two teams in each division a playoff spot. The last four qualifiers were from the next-best four regular-season records from teams finishing third or lower.

Teams were required to place the last names of players on the back of all jerseys starting with this season, but Toronto Maple Leafs owner Harold Ballard initially refused, fearing that he would not be able to sell programs at his team's games. The NHL responded by threatening to levy a fine on the team in February 1978, so Ballard complied by making the letters the same color as the background they were on, which for the team's road jerseys was blue. The League threatened further sanctions, and despite playing more than one game with their "unreadable" sweaters, Ballard's Maple Leafs finally complied in earnest by making the letters white on the blue road jerseys. (Blue letter names would not come to the white home jerseys until the following year.)

Officials began wearing their surnames on the back of their sweaters instead of being identified by numbers, as they were previously. The NHL returned to using uniform numbers for officials for the 1994-95 season.

Regular season

Bobby Orr sat out the season to rest his oft-injured knee in the hope that rest would allow him to return to play in 1978–79; he would return for that season, only playing in six games before retiring.

On December 11, 1977, the Philadelphia Flyers' Tom Bladon became the first defenceman in NHL history to score eight points in one game. He scored four goals and four assists versus the Cleveland Barons. It was 25% of his point total for the entire season.

The Colorado Rockies qualified for the playoffs for the first time in franchise history. They would not make the playoffs again until after the team had moved to New Jersey, in 1988. The next time the playoffs came to Colorado would be the Colorado Avalanche's championship season of 1996.

Final standings
GP = Games Played, W = Wins, L = Losses, T = Ties, Pts = Points, GF = Goals For, GA = Goals Against, PIM = Penalties in minutes

Teams that qualified for the playoffs are highlighted in bold

Prince of Wales Conference

Clarence Campbell Conference

Playoffs
The playoffs were held in four rounds, preliminary, quarterfinals, semifinals and finals. In the preliminary round, the Detroit Red Wings was the only lower-placed team to win over the higher-placed team. The Red Wings were then defeated in five games by the first-place Montreal Canadiens. The Toronto Maple Leafs defeated the Los Angeles Kings to advance to the quarterfinals, where the Leafs upset the third-place New York Islanders in seven games, setting up an "Original Six" playoff against Montreal. The upsets ended there as the Canadiens swept the Leafs to advance to the finals. In the other groupings, the higher-placed team won each round, and the second-place Boston Bruins advanced to the finals against the first-place Canadiens. In the finals, the Canadiens defeated the Bruins in six games to win their third consecutive Stanley Cup.

The Colorado Rockies made their one and only playoff appearance in the preliminary round against the Philadelphia Flyers, and were swept in two games. It would take another ten years before they got to the playoffs again in New Jersey. The Chicago Black Hawks were swept in the other "Original Six" matchup of the playoffs, losing to Boston in the quarterfinals.

Playoff seeds

The twelve teams that qualified for the playoffs are ranked 1–12 based on regular season points.

Note: Only teams that qualified for the playoffs are listed here.

 Montreal Canadiens, Norris Division champions, Prince of Wales Conference regular season champions – 129 points
 Boston Bruins, Adams Division champions – 113 points
 New York Islanders, Patrick Division champions, Clarence Campbell Conference regular season champions – 111 points
 Philadelphia Flyers – 105 points (45 wins)
 Buffalo Sabres – 105 points (44 wins)
 Toronto Maple Leafs – 92 points
 Atlanta Flames – 87 points
 Chicago Black Hawks, Smythe Division champions – 83 points
 Detroit Red Wings – 78 points
 Los Angeles Kings – 77 points
 New York Rangers – 73 points
 Colorado Rockies – 59 points

Playoff bracket

 Division winners earned a bye to the Quarterfinals
 Teams were re-seeded based on regular season record after the Preliminary and Quarterfinal rounds

Preliminary round

(1) Philadelphia Flyers vs. (8) Colorado Rockies

This was the first playoff series meeting between these two teams. It was the Rockies' only playoff appearance in their first eight seasons before moving to New Jersey in 1982 (including two years in Kansas City and six in Denver).

(2) Buffalo Sabres vs. (7) New York Rangers

This was the first playoff series meeting between these two teams.

(3) Toronto Maple Leafs vs. (6) Los Angeles Kings

This was the second playoff series meeting between these two teams. The only previous meeting was in the 1975 Preliminary Round, in which Toronto won the series 2–1.

(4) Atlanta Flames vs. (5) Detroit Red Wings

This was the first playoff series between these two teams; they would not meet again in Stanley Cup play until 2004, after the Flames had relocated to Calgary. (The Flames never won a playoff series while representing Atlanta, losing all six over an eight-year period.)

For Detroit, it was their only playoff series win in the twenty years between 1967 and 1986.

Quarterfinals

(1) Montreal Canadiens vs. (8) Detroit Red Wings

This was the 12th playoff series meeting between these two teams. Detroit led 7–4 in previous playoff meetings. Montreal won their most recent meeting in six games in the 1966 Stanley Cup Finals.

Game 4 was the final playoff game at the Detroit Olympia.

(2) Boston Bruins vs. (7) Chicago Black Hawks

This was the sixth playoff meeting between these two teams. Boston won four of the previous five meetings. Chicago won their last series meeting 2–1 in the 1975 Preliminary Round.

(3) New York Islanders vs. (6) Toronto Maple Leafs

This was the first playoff series meeting between these two teams.

(4) Philadelphia Flyers vs. (5) Buffalo Sabres

This was the second playoff series meeting between these two teams. Philadelphia won the only previous meeting in six games in the 1975 Stanley Cup Finals.

Semifinals

(1) Montreal Canadiens vs. (4) Toronto Maple Leafs

This was the 14th playoff series meeting between these two teams. Toronto lead 7–6 in previous meetings. Toronto won the most recent meeting in six games in the 1967 Stanley Cup Finals.

(2) Boston Bruins vs. (3) Philadelphia Flyers

This was the fourth playoff series meeting between these two teams. Philadelphia won two of the previous three meetings. This was the third straight semifinal meeting following Philadelphia's win in five games in 1976 and Boston's four-game sweep last season.

Game five was Fred Shero's last game as head coach of the Flyers, and Gerry Cheevers left the ice without shaking hands with any of the Flyers.

Stanley Cup Finals

This was the 17th playoff series (and the last Finals) meeting between these two teams. Montreal led 14–2 in previous meetings. This was a rematch of last year's Stanley Cup Finals, in which Montreal won in a four-game sweep.

Awards
The league introduced the Frank J. Selke trophy this season. It rewards the forward judged to be the best at defensive abilities.

All-Star teams

Player statistics

Scoring leaders
GP = Games Played, G = Goals, A = Assists, Pts = Points, PIM = Penalties In Minutes

Source: NHL.

Leading goaltenders

Note: GP = Games played; Min = Minutes played; GA = Goals against; GAA = Goals against average; W = Wins; L = Losses; T = Ties; SO = Shutouts

Other statistics
Plus-minus
 Guy Lafleur, Montreal Canadiens

Coaches

Patrick Division
Atlanta Flames: Fred Creighton
New York Islanders: Al Arbour
New York Rangers: Jean-Guy Talbot
Philadelphia Flyers: Fred Shero and Bob McCammon

Adams Division
Boston Bruins: Don Cherry
Buffalo Sabres: Marcel Pronovost
Cleveland Barons: Jack Evans
Toronto Maple Leafs: Roger Neilson

Norris Division
Detroit Red Wings: Bobby Kromm
Los Angeles Kings: Ron Stewart
Montreal Canadiens: Scotty Bowman
Pittsburgh Penguins: Johnny Wilson
Washington Capitals: Tom McVie

Smythe Division
Chicago Black Hawks: Bob Pulford
Colorado Rockies: Patrick Kelly
Minnesota North Stars: Andre Beaulieu and Lou Nanne
St. Louis Blues: Leo Boivin and Barclay Plager
Vancouver Canucks: Orland Kurtenbach

Debuts
The following is a list of players of note who played their first NHL game in 1977–78 (listed with their first team, asterisk(*) marks debut in playoffs):
Doug Wilson, Chicago Black Hawks
Barry Beck, Colorado Rockies
Dale McCourt, Detroit Red Wings
Vaclav Nedomansky, Detroit Red Wings
Dave Taylor, Los Angeles Kings
Mike Bossy, New York Islanders
Ron Duguay, New York Rangers
Glen Hanlon, Vancouver Canucks
Murray Bannerman, Vancouver Canucks
Robert Picard, Washington Capitals

Nedomansky began his major professional career in the World Hockey Association.

Last games
The following is a list of players of note that played their last game in the NHL in 1977–78 (listed with their last team):
Johnny Bucyk, Boston Bruins
Eddie Johnston, Chicago Black Hawks
Jim Neilson, Cleveland Barons
Dennis Hull, Detroit Red Wings
Ed Giacomin, Detroit Red Wings
Bill Goldsworthy, New York Rangers
Dallas Smith, New York Rangers
Ken Hodge, New York Rangers
Rod Gilbert, New York Rangers
Gary Dornhoefer, Philadelphia Flyers
Derek Sanderson, Pittsburgh Penguins
Claude Larose, St. Louis Blues
Bob Plager, St. Louis Blues
Jim Roberts, St. Louis Blues
Red Berenson, St. Louis Blues
Cesare Maniago, Vancouver Canucks

NOTE: Goldsworthy and Neilson would finish their major professional careers in the World Hockey Association.

See also 
 List of Stanley Cup champions
 1977 NHL Amateur Draft
 1977–78 NHL transactions
 31st National Hockey League All-Star Game
 National Hockey League All-Star Game
 1977–78 WHA season
 1977 in sports
 1978 in sports

References
 
 
 
 

Notes

External links
Hockey Database
NHL.com

 
1977–78 in Canadian ice hockey by league
1977–78 in American ice hockey by league